Jawahar Navodaya Vidyalaya Kanpur (also known as JNV Kanpur or JNVK) is a boarding school, set up in Kanpur, India, in 1987. It is an autonomous body which works under the Department of Education, Ministry of Human Resource Development (India). The concept of opening a boarding school, called Navodaya Vidyalaya, in every district of India was born as a part of the section 5.15 in New Policy on Education(NPE86). Jawahar Navodaya Vidyalaya Kanpur has a campus of 35 acres, close to national highway (NH-2) (GT Road) near Navodaya Nagar, Sarsaul, Kanpur( 26°16'6"N,  80°30'1"E). It is a fully residential boarding school which provides accommodation to students, faculty and staff.

History
JNV Sarsaul Kanpur Nagar was established in 1987. The school sprawls over 35 acre of land, full of lush green trees. It educates children mainly from a rural background. Affiliated with the CBSE the school imparts education in the streams of Science and Commerce.  The third language of the school is Kannada and migration linkage is with the JNV Bijapur Karnataka state.

Academics
The results of class X and XII examinations of the Vidyalayas have been consistently better than the overall CBSE national averages.

Infrastructure
The campus is on 35 acre of land, with two boys hostels, two girls hostels, 42 staff apartments, administrative block, academic building, one multipurpose hall and two dining halls where more than 500 students take their breakfast, lunch and dinner, a  library with approximately 6500 books and magazines, including magazine and news papers in Hindi, English and Kannada languages. The Career Corner has books for exams and professional courses.

 There is a Computer lab having 25 computers with one server connected with LAN also including broad band Internet facility.
 There is a playground with a 400 metre 8 lane track, two basketball grounds, one handball ground, five volleyball grounds, two Kho-Kho grounds, two Kabbadi grounds, one football ground, multiple TT tables and a gymnasium.
 Physics, Chemistry and Biology laboratories.

References

External links 
 Navodaya Vidyalaya Samiti
  Jawahar Navodaya Vidyalaya Sarsaul Kanpur
  JNV Kanpur Alumni Association
  Navodaya Vidyalaya Samiti
  All India Navodaya Alumni Association ( AINAA)
 Jawahar Navodaya Vidyalaya

Jawahar Navodaya Vidyalayas in Uttar Pradesh
High schools and secondary schools in Uttar Pradesh
Boarding schools in Uttar Pradesh
Schools in Kanpur
Educational institutions established in 1987
1987 establishments in Uttar Pradesh